The badminton women's singles tournament at the 1986 Asian Games in Seoul took place from 30 September to 4 October.

Schedule
All times are Korea Standard Time (UTC+09:00)

Results

Final

Top half

Bottom half

References
 1st round results
 2nd round results
 Quarterfinals results
 Semifinals results
 Final results

Women's singles